Afro-Belgians  or Black Belgians, are defined as Belgian citizens and members of the Black African community and diaspora in Belgium.

Belgium national team 
In 2017, 19 out of 52 total players in the men's Belgium national football team were of African origin.

Notable Afro-Belgians

Football players

 Jackson Tchatchoua
 Lamisha Musonda
 Charly Musonda
 Cyril Ngonge
 Dylan Damraoui
 Ibrahima Cissé
 Isaac Asare
 Michy Batshuayi
 Manuel Benson
 Christian Benteke
 Jonathan Benteke
 Mayola Biboko
 Anthony Vanden Borre
 Dedryck Boyata
 Jonathan Buatu
 Luis Pedro Cavanda
 Mousa Dembélé
 Jason Denayer
 Arnaud Djoum
 Emmanuel Eboué
 Nathan Kabasele
 Vincent Kompany
 Cheikhou Kouyaté
 Mulopo Kudimbana
 Roland Lamah
 Aaron Leya Iseka
 Jordan Lukaku
 Romelu Lukaku
 Roger Lukaku
 Junior Malanda
 Ilombe Mboyo
 Gaby Mudingayi
 Maecky Ngombo
 Denis Odoi
 Marvin Ogunjimi
 Funso Ojo
 Divock Origi
 Ebrima Ebou Sillah
 Youri Tielemans
 Bertin Tokéné
 Axel Witsel
 Clinton Mata
 Cyriel Dessers
 Denzel Jubitana
 Mike Mampuya
 Vadis Odjidja-Ofoe
 Johan Bakayoko
 Tyrese Omotoye
 Beni Badibanga
 Kéres Masangu
 Antef Tsoungui
 Maecky Ngombo
 Gerard
 Samuel Bastien
 Killian Sardella
Koni De Winter
 Mario Stroeykens
 Nathan de Medina
 Regillio Tuur
 Loïs Openda
 Igor Vetokele
 Amadou Onana 
 Émile Mpenza
 Floribert N'Galula
 Pieter Mbemba
 Ryan Mmaee
 Samy Mmaee
 Scott Bitsindou
 Senna Miangué
 Seydina Diarra

Other sports
 Corliss Waitman
 D. J. Mbenga, basketball player
 Élodie Ouédraogo, track athlete
 Nafissatou Thiam, heptathlon athlete
 Sugar Jackson, boxer

Politicians
 Assita Kanko, politician, member of the European Parliament
 Pierre Kompany, politician, the first black mayor in Belgium, father of football player Vincent Kompany
 Wouter Van Bellingen, politician and the first black alderman in Belgium

Arts and music
 Damso, rapper
 Leki, singer
 Ronny Mosuse, singer-songwriter
 Stromae, singer-songwriter
 Roland Gunst, film director

References

Ethnic groups in Belgium